Brett de Thier (born 14 June 1945) is a New Zealand sailor. He competed in the Finn event at the 1972 Summer Olympics.

References

External links
 

1945 births
Living people
New Zealand male sailors (sport)
Olympic sailors of New Zealand
Sailors at the 1972 Summer Olympics – Finn
Sportspeople from Christchurch